"How Much Can We Boost IQ and Achievement?" is a 1969 article by Arthur Jensen published in the Harvard Educational Review. It is among the most controversial in American psychology, and was largely responsible for initiating the current debate over race and intelligence.

Overview

Jensen's argument consisted of a series of related claims. IQ tests are valid measurements of a real human ability—what people generally describe as "intelligence"—that is important to many parts of contemporary life. Intelligence, as measured by IQ tests, is about 80 percent heritable. Intelligent parents are much more likely to have intelligent children than other parents. Remedial educational programs have failed to raise the measured intelligence of individuals or groups. Indeed, one of the most inflammatory sentences is the opener: "Compensatory education has been tried and apparently has failed." The article generated extensive discussion and controversy both in the popular press and in the academic literature. The article prompted 29 academic rebuttals published in the same journal, which eventually decided to refuse reprints or allow Jensen to respond to critical letters. Some college students also responded to the publication of the paper by burning effigies of Jensen and sending him death threats. In 1982, Schiff et al. conducted an adoption study that aimed to provide a direct answer to the question Jensen had posted in his 1969 paper. They reported that children who were adopted into families of a higher social class experienced, on average, "an increase of 14 IQ points in the mean IQ score estimated with 2 tests and a reduction by a factor of 4 in the probability of repeating a grade."

Jensen's critics argue that most aspects of his analysis were flawed: IQ tests do not provide a stable or meaningful measure of intelligence; IQ is affected by the environment and not solely or mainly a function of genetics; there is no evidence for genetic differences in racial intelligence; and that the entire topic was too controversial to be productively discussed.

Controversy over the article led to the coining of the term "Jensenism" defined as the theory that IQ is largely determined by genes, including racial heritage. The article generated significant attention to, and protests against, Jensen's work.

See also
 History of the race and intelligence controversy

References

Bibliography
 
 

  reprinted in 

 

 

Intelligence quotient
Academic journal articles
Race and intelligence controversy
1969 documents